Mark Jonathon Mortlock Simmonds (born 12 April 1964) is a Conservative Party politician in the United Kingdom.  He was the Member of Parliament (MP) for Boston and Skegness in Lincolnshire, and was first elected in 2001, succeeding Sir Richard Body. He was re-elected in 2005 with a greatly increased majority before his subsequent re-election in 2010 – more than doubling his 2005 majority.

In September 2012 he was appointed to the Government as a Parliamentary Under-Secretary of State for Asia and the Pacific. On 11 August 2014 he resigned this post and confirmed that he would step down as an MP at the 2015 general election.

In October 2015, he was appointed non-executive director of the AIM-listed fertiliser company, African Potash. On 6 January 2020, Simmonds was appointed a non-executive director of the AIM-listed African oil exploration company, LEKOIL, a week before the company announced that it had been the victim of a US$184m fraud.

Early life
Born in Worksop, Simmonds went to Worksop College, then Trent Polytechnic, where he obtained a BSc (Hons) degree in urban estate surveying in 1986. He became an associate of the Royal Institution of Chartered Surveyors in 1987. He worked as a surveyor for Savills from 1986 to 1988 and was a partner in Strutt & Parker from 1988 to 1996. He was a director of Hillier Parker from 1997 to 1999 and a chairman of Mortlock Simmonds Brown from 1999 until becoming an MP for Boston and Skegness.

Parliamentary career
He contested the Ashfield seat in 1997. Simmonds was promoted to Shadow Health Minister in 2007.

On 5 September 2012, he was appointed as a Parliamentary Under-Secretary of State in the Foreign and Commonwealth Office.  In this role, he was also responsible for the British Overseas Territories. He resigned on 11 August 2014, claiming that he cannot support his family in London on £120k + expenses. According to the Telegraph, although Simmonds legitimately received over £500k from expenses since 2001, changes in the rules following the 2009 United Kingdom parliamentary expenses scandal meant he was no longer able to claim mortgage relief on a house in Putney.  He subsequently sold the house at a profit of £537k and bought Swineshead Abbey but said it was impossible for "a government minister with children to have a normal family life."

He voted against the Cameron–Clegg coalition government in 2013 on the issue of British military intervention in the Syrian civil war.

Following his decision not to stand again, Simmonds defended charging expenses to the taxpayer purported to total over £10,000 on hoardings and local radio, advertising the role of the MP and promoting democracy in line with current IPSA guidelines. He claimed the money was necessary to communicate with constituents. The political campaigning website 38 Degrees set up a petition calling for him to pay it back.

In 2014 he was appointed to the Privy Council, entitling him to the style "The Right Honourable" for life.

Personal life
He married Lizbeth Hanomancin Garcia in December 1994 in London, and they have two daughters (born March 1999 and October 2000) and a son (born April 2002). He lives in his constituency in Swineshead in a house on the former site of Swineshead Abbey.

In 2012 he apologised to Parliament for failing to mention an interest in Circle Healthcare when speaking in support of the Health and Social Care Bill in Parliament.

References

External links

 
 Guardian Unlimited Politics - Ask Aristotle: Mark Simmonds MP
 TheyWorkForYou.com - Mark Simmonds MP
 Video: Open Road - Mark Simmonds interview, hosted by YouTube. Mark Simmonds talks about welfare reforms proposed by the coalition Government.

News items
 Concern over gangmasters in 2003

1964 births
Living people
Alumni of Nottingham Trent University
People educated at Worksop College
Conservative Party (UK) MPs for English constituencies
UK MPs 2001–2005
UK MPs 2005–2010
UK MPs 2010–2015
People from Worksop
Members of the Privy Council of the United Kingdom
People from Swineshead, Lincolnshire